Mark Hart (born 1968) is an American politician, paramedic, and firefighter serving as a member of the Kentucky House of Representatives from the 78th district. Elected in November 2016, he assumed office in January 2017.

Early life and education 
Born and raised in Falmouth, Kentucky, Hart graduated from Pendleton County High School. He earned a Bachelor of Science degree in biology and psychology from Northern Kentucky University.

Career 
In 1995, Hart began his career as a biological science research assistant for the Centers for Disease Control and Prevention. From 1993 to 1996, he worked as a substitute teacher for the Pendleton County Schools. From 1996 to 1999, Hart was a blood bank technician at the Hoxworth Blood Center. From 1994 to 2003, Hart served as a artilleryman and medic in the Kentucky Army National Guard. He later served as a fire lieutenant in the Lexington Fire Department. He also worked for the Cynthiana/Harrison County Emergency Management Agency and served as a captain for the Pendleton County Emergency Medical Service. Hart was elected to the Kentucky House of Representatives in November 2016 and assumed office in January 2017. Since 2017, he has served as vice chair of the House Agriculture Committee.

References 

1968 births
Living people
People from Pendleton County, Kentucky
Northern Kentucky University alumni
Republican Party members of the Kentucky House of Representatives